The 2006 Czech Figure Skating Championships were held in České Budějovice between December 15 and 18, 2005. Skaters competed in the disciplines of men's singles, ladies' singles, pair skating, and ice dancing on the senior, junior, and novice levels.

The senior compulsory dance was the Romantic Tango. The first junior compulsory dance was the Austrian Waltz and the second was the Quickstep. The first novice compulsory dance was the Rocker Foxtrot and the second was the Paso Doble.

Senior results

Men

Ladies

Pairs

Ice dancing

Junior results

Men

Ladies

Ice dancing

Novice results

Ice dancing

External links
 2006 Czech Figure Skating Championships

2005 in figure skating
Czech Figure Skating Championships, 2006
Czech Figure Skating Championships
2006 in Czech sport